Martyr Worthy is a small village in the English county of Hampshire. It is part of the Worthys cluster of small villages.

Martyr Worthy is located on the banks of the River Itchen to the northeast of the city of Winchester.

The place-name 'Martyr Worthy' is first attested in Episcopal Registers of 1243, where it appears as Wordia le Martre. 'Worthy' means 'enclosure', and Martyr Worthy is recorded as having been held by Henricus la Martre in 1201. 'Martre' may be Old French martre meaning martyr, or meaning marten and used as a nickname

The village has a Church of England parish church – St Swithun's –  which is Grade II* listed.

Governance
The village is part of the civil parish of Itchen Valley and is part of the City of Winchester non-metropolitan district of Hampshire County Council.

References

External links

History and descriptions
GENUKI page
 Stained Glass Windows at St. Swithun, Martyr Worthy, Hampshire

Villages in Hampshire